Mothers (Macedonian: Мајки / Majki) is a 2010 film by Milcho Manchevski. An international co-production, the film mingles fiction with documentary.

Premise
Three stories, all true, one real.  Employing an innovative structure, the three stories in Mothers highlight the delicate relationship of truth and fiction, of drama and documentary. What is the nature of truth? The film eschews neat narrative devices and pushes to confront their own definitions of filmic reality.

The three stories focus on three aspects of life in contemporary Republic of Macedonia (a city, a small town and a deserted village).  Mothers, whose motto is “The Truth Hurts” explores the nature of truth – all three stories (two fiction and one documentary) are based on real events, but only one - the most incredible - is told as  documentary. This story examines the unsolved mystery of the Kichevo serial killer who murdered several retired cleaning women. A crime reporter who covered the stories was arrested, and two days later he was found dead with his head in a bucket of water. A suicide note was found in his cell.

Cast

 Ana Stojanovska as Ana
 Ratka Radmanovic as Grandma
 Salaetin Bilal as Grandpa
 Vladimir Jacev as Kole
 Maria Kozhevnikova
 Dimitar Gjorgjievski as Simon
 Irina Apelgren as Salina
 Emilija Stojkovska as Bea
 Milijana Bogdanoska as Kjara
 Dime Ilijev as Sergeant Janeski
 Marina Pankova as Mrs. Matilda
 Goran Trifunovski as Zoki
 Petar Mircevski as Raspusto
 Blagoja Spirkovski-Dzumerko as Laze
 Boris Corevski as Baterija
 Tamer Ibrahim as Officer Iljov

Production
Mothers is international co-production, that mingles fiction with documentary.

The film was written and directed by Milcho Manchevski, and produced by Christina Kallas. Vladimir Samoilovski was the director of photography, David Munns was the production designer, Zaklina Stojcevska edited the film, and the music was composed by Igor Vasilev - Novogradska. Principal photography took place in three areas in Macedonia: Mariovo, Kicevo and Skopje, Macedonia.

Release
Mothers premiered at the Toronto International Film Festival and had its European premiere in the Panorama section of the 61st Berlin International Film Festival.

Reception

Critical reception
Natasha Senjanovic of The Hollywood Reporter said "Manchevski mixes fiction with documentary in a film that hits home on an emotional rather than intellectual level".

Diego Pierini writing in LoudVision said Mothers is a very strange film, sometimes sophisticated, poignant and often elliptical.[...] One of the most interesting and original filmmakers of recent years [...] One of those authors who are not afraid to face the genres and to push the boundaries.

Awards
The film won the following awards:
Minsk International Film Festival Listapad: "Award for Film as Art Phenomenon", 2011
Directing award – LIFFE 2011
European Film Committee recommendation - 24th EFA Film Awards invitation, 2011
Cinema City Festival: FEDEORA (Federation of Film Critics of Europe and the Mediterranean), 2011
FEST: Critics Award for Best FEST Film “Nebojsa Djukelic”, 2011
FEST: Special Jury Prize in the selection "Europe Out of Europe", 2011
MTV Adria Movie Awards: Best Movie nomination, 2011
Macedonian Academy Award Submission: Best Foreign-Language Film, 2010

See also
 List of submissions to the 83rd Academy Awards for Best Foreign Language Film
 List of Macedonian submissions for the Academy Award for Best Foreign Language Film

References

External links

2010 films
Macedonian drama films
Macedonian-language films
2010 drama films
Macedonian documentary films
Films directed by Milcho Manchevski